Aladja is a coastal town in Delta State, Nigeria. It is located on the bank of southern part of River Warri. The majority of the people are of Udu, a sub-group of Urhobo ethnic group. a section of the town was occupied by some people of Ijaw ethnic group who eventually migrated because of the bloody land disputes that existed between Urhobos and Ijaws in the 1990s. The Delta Steel Company (DSC), an integrated steel manufacturing industry is situated on hectares of land provided by both Ovwian and Aladja communities but the steel plant is currently redundant as a result of mismanagement. However, the federal government of Nigeria, is making concerted effort to privatize the plant. It was recently linked with a modern rail line from northern part of the country to ease the transport of raw materials (Iron ore) and finished products (steel) between the plant and other parts of the country.
Aladja, as a coastal community, it has been a haven of commerce between the coastal people and hinterland since ancient times. The act of trade by barter is still being practiced in the popular Aladja Market to this day. Aladja has served for many decades as the route to old Warri mainland via its famous 'Aladja Waterside' until the construction of the Udu Bridge in 1975 as an alternative route to Warri and its environs.

Notable People
 Richard Mofe Damijo (Nigerian actor)
 Ushbebe - (Nigerian comedian)
 B.O. Tietie (Christian - Television Minister and Evangelist).

References 

Populated places in Delta State